Cesson Rennes Métropole Handball, is a team handball club from Cesson-Sévigné, France. The club was formed in 1968 being called OC Cesson. In 2011 a new club was created with a new name.

Crest, colours, supporters

Naming history

Kits

Sports Hall information

Name: – Glaz Arena
City: – Cesson-Sévigné
Capacity: – 4500
Address: – Chemin du Bois de la Justice, 35510 Cesson-Sévigné, France

Team

Current squad 

Squad for the 2022–23 season

Technical staff
 Head coach:  Sébastien Leriche
 Assistant coach:  Yann Lemaire
 Physiotherapist:  Thibaut Minel
 Club doctor:  Thierry Le Bars

Former club members

Notable former players

  Jean-Jacques Acquevillo (2018–2019)
  Igor Anić (2012-2014, 2019-2021)
  Frédéric Beauregard (2017–2019)
  Robin Cantegrel (2019-2020)
  Yann Genty (2012-2014)
  Hugo Kamtchop-Baril (2014-2022)
  Nicolas Lemonne (2009-2013)
  Mickaël Robin (2014-2016)
  El Hadi Biloum (2009-2012)
  Sassi Boultif (2012-2013)
  Thomas Bolaers (2017-2020)
  Bram Dewit (2007-2010)
  Jef Lettens (2016–2019)
  Simon Ooms (2017-2018)
  Arber Qerimi (2017-2018)
  Duško Čelica (2013-2014)
  Alexis Bertrand (2005–2007, 2008-2010)
  Rudolf Faluvégi (2019, 2021-)
  István Rédei (2014-2015)
  Sajjad Esteki (2019-2021)
  Guðmundur Hólmar Helgason (2016-2018)
  Michele Skatar (2014-2016)
  Ghennadii Solomon (2006-2007)
  Michał Szyba (2018-2019)
  Wilson Davyes (2015-2017)
  Miguel Espinha Ferreira (2021-)
  Rok Zaponsek (2020-2021)
  Wael Horri (2010-2012)

Former coaches

References

External links
 
 

French handball clubs
Sport in Ille-et-Vilaine